In 1995, the opening year of its publication, James Taylor's Shocked and Amazed! On & Off the Midway became the first journal to chronicle the history of sideshows, novelty and variety exhibition or “the show business” as it was called in the heyday of the dime museums. Focusing on circus and carnival sideshows and 19th Century dime museum entertainment, the journal also follows the history and characters of vaudeville and burlesque, wax museums and world's fairs, carnivals, circus spectacles, roadside attractions and everything in between. The journal features interviews with the business’ “golden age” performers as well as modern talent and has included original works by the likes of Teller (magician), John Strausbaugh and Frank DeFord and unique reprinted material available previously to only a few show business historians.

Shocked and Amazed! has been recognized as the leading journal on the business in such venues as The Learning Channel, The History Channel, E!: Entertainment Television, Channel 4 in London, the National Geographic Channel and major network television.

Shocked and Amazed! Volumes 1-9 were published by James Taylor's Dolphin-Moon Press, while a “Best Of” Shocked and Amazed! was published in 2002 by Lyons/Globe Pequot, co-crediting James Taylor (author) and Kathleen Kotcher.

External links
 Shocked and Amazed - On & Off the Midway
 Showhistory.com
 Sideshow-art.com
 Sideshowworld.com

Entertainment magazines published in the United States
Magazines established in 1995